Qeshlaq-e Hajji Hasan (also Romanized as Qēshlāq-e Ḩājjī Ḩasan) is a village in Mokriyan-e Shomali Rural District, in the Central District of Miandoab County, West Azerbaijan Province, Iran. At the 2006 census, its population was 79, in 18 families.

References 

Populated places in Miandoab County